Aloracetam (INN) is a drug described as a nootropic which is closely related to, but technically not of (as it lacks a pyrrolidone ring), the racetam family of compounds. It was studied by Aventis for the treatment of Alzheimer's disease, but was never marketed.

See also
 Piracetam

References

Racetams
Pyrroles
Acetamides
Nootropics
Abandoned drugs